Mark Eastman Martinez (born December 18, 1961) is an American college baseball coach and former shortstop. He is the head baseball coach at San Diego State University. Martinez played college baseball at Mesa State College from 1982 to 1984. Martinez was previously assistant coach under Tony Gwynn at San Diego State from 2006 to 2014. Nearly two months after Gwynn's death, San Diego State promoted Martinez to head coach on August 20, 2014.

Head coaching record

See also
 List of current NCAA Division I baseball coaches

References

1961 births
Living people
Baseball shortstops
Sportspeople from Aurora, Colorado
Colorado Mesa Mavericks baseball players
New Mexico Lobos baseball coaches
San Diego State Aztecs baseball coaches
Baseball coaches from Colorado
University of New Mexico alumni
People from Longmont, Colorado